Thomas Bell may refer to:

Arts and entertainment
Thomas Bell (born 1985), known professionally as Toddla T, English DJ and producer
Thomas Bell (antiquarian) (1785–1860), English book collector
Thomas Bell (novelist) (1903–1961), American novelist
Tom Bell (actor) (1933–2006), British actor
Tom Bell (comedy actor), British comedy actor
Thom Bell (1943–2022), Jamaican-born American record producer

Politics
Thomas Bell (mayor of Gloucester) (1486–1566), English cap manufacturer, mayor of Gloucester and MP
Sir Hugh Bell, 2nd Baronet (Thomas Hugh Bell, 1844–1931), mayor of Middlesbrough, England
Thomas Montgomery Bell (1861–1941), Democratic US Congressman from Georgia
Thomas M. Bell (Ohio politician) (born 1950s), Democratic representative in the Ohio House of Representatives
Thomas Bell (politician) (1863–1945), Canadian politician
Thomas Hamilton Bell (1878–1939), businessman and political figure in Ontario
Thomas Miller Bell (1923–1996), Canadian Member of Parliament
Thomas Hastie Bell (1867–1942), Scottish anarchist
Thomas S. Bell (1800–1861), American judge and politician
Tom Bell (politician) (1882–1944), British communist activist

Religion
Thomas Bell (Catholic priest) (1551–1610), English Roman Catholic priest, later an anti-Catholic writer
Thomas Bell (minister) (1733–1802), Scottish theologian and translator
Thomas Bell (Anglican priest) (1820–1917), Dean of Guernsey, 1892–1917

Sports
Thomas Bell (footballer, born 1884) (1884–1951), English footballer
Tommy Bell (footballer, born 1906) (1906–1983), English footballer
Tommy Bell (footballer, born 1923) (1923–1988), English footballer
Tommy Bell (Australian footballer) (1895–1955), Australian rules footballer for Essendon
Tom Bell (Australian footballer) (born 1991), Australian rules footballer for Carlton
Tommy Bell (American football official) (1922–1986), American football official in the National Football League
Tommy Bell (American football player) (born 1932), American football player, member of Army Black Knights football
Thomas H. Bell (born 1944), American football and lacrosse coach
Tommy Bell (rugby union) (born 1992), rugby union player for London Irish
Tommy Bell (boxer) (1923–1994), African-American boxer

Other
Thomas Bell (ironmaster) (1784–1858), co-founder of Losh, Wilson and Bell - iron and alkali company
Thomas Bell (zoologist) (1792–1880), English zoologist, surgeon and writer
Thomas B. Bell (1796–1858), Texas landowner of Stephen F. Austin's Old Three Hundred
Thomas Bell (capitalist) (1820–1892), Scottish-American investor and banker
Tom Bell (outlaw) (1825–1856), American outlaw and physician
Thomas Cowan Bell (1832–1919), co-founder of Sigma Chi Fraternity
Thomas S. Bell Jr. (1838–1862), Union Army officer killed in action at the Battle of Antietam
Thomas Bell (engineer) (1865–1952), British engineer and shipbuilder